Świeciechów is a village in the administrative district of Gmina Mniszków, within Opoczno County, Łódź Voivodeship, in central Poland.

References

External links
 Satellite image on Terraserver

Villages in Opoczno County